Tyube (Töbe) is an urban locality (an urban-type settlement) in Kumtorkalinsky District of the Republic of Dagestan, Russia. As of the 2010 Census, its population was 6,496.

Administrative and municipal status
Within the framework of administrative divisions, the urban-type settlement of Tyube is incorporated within Kumtorkalinsky District as Tyube Settlement (an administrative division of the district). As a municipal division, Tyube Settlement is incorporated within Kumtorkalinsky Municipal District as Tyube Urban Settlement.

References

Notes

Sources

Urban-type settlements in the Republic of Dagestan
